Stanich's was a restaurant in Portland, Oregon's Cully neighborhood, established in 1949.

History
The restaurant was founded by Gladys and George Stanich in 1949. Their son, Steve Stanich, became the current owner.

In 2017, the restaurant's cheeseburger with grilled onions received the "best burger in America" award from Thrillist. Stanich's closed temporarily in January 2018, and as of August, planned to reopen.

The restaurant's future was unclear, as of November 2018. Local media outlets suggested Stanich's would re-open in January or February 2019. Stanich's reopened in March 2019, but had closed again by March 2020. Stanich's is permanently closed due to owner Steven Stanich's illegal activity, including strangling his wife and reckless driving.

See also 

 List of defunct restaurants of the United States
 List of hamburger restaurants

References

External links

 
 Stanich's at Zomato

1949 establishments in Oregon
Cully, Portland, Oregon
Defunct hamburger restaurants
Defunct restaurants in Portland, Oregon
Northeast Portland, Oregon
Restaurants established in 1949
Hamburger restaurants in the United States